Hemiphyllodactylus typus, also known as the Indopacific tree gecko, Indopacific slender gecko,  or common dwarf gecko, is a species of gecko found in South Asia, Southeast Asia, and East Asia, and some islands in the Indian and Pacific Oceans.

Distribution
India (Shevaroy Hills, Anaimalai, Nilgiri Hills), Nicobar Islands, Sri Lanka, 
Indochina, Vietnam, Chapa/Tongking, Thailand, W Malaysia, Singapore, 
Oceania, Burma, Philippines (Panay), Indonesia (Borneo, Sumatra, Java, Bali, Sumbawa, Komodo),
China, Taiwan, New Guinea, New Caledonia, Loyalty Islands, Tonga, Marquesas Islands, Society Islands, Pitcairn Islands, Solomon Islands, Fiji Islands (Vanua Levu, Viti Levu),
Mauritius, Reunion, Rodrigues (fide F. Glaw, pers. comm.)
Introduced to Ryukyu Islands (Japan),
Introduced to Iriomotejima Island,
Introduced into the USA (Hawaii)

Type locality: "Agam" [West-Sumatra] [Kluge 1968] and "Goenong Parong (Java)" [= Gunung Parang, West-Java] (Wermuth 1965)

References

 Bauer, A.M. & Das, I. 1999 The systematic status of the endemic south Indian gecko Hemidactylus aurantiacus (Beddome 1870). J. South Asian Nat. Hist. 4 (2): 213-218
 Beddome, R.H. 1870 Descriptions of some new lizards from the Madras Presidency. Madras Monthly J. Med. Sci. 1: 30-35
 Boulenger, G.A. 1887 Note on some reptiles from Sumatra described by BLEEKER in 1860. Ann. Mag. Nat. Hist. (5) 20: 152
 Pauwels, O.S.G., and Bauer, A.M. 2001 Hemiphyllodactylus typus, distribution. Herpetol. Rev. 32:119.
 Schröder, E. & Röll, B. 2004 Hemiphyllodactylus typus BLEEKER. Sauria Supplement 26 (3): 617-622

Further reading
 Zug, George. Speciation and Dispersal in a Low Diversity Taxon: The Slender Geckos Hemiphyllodactylus (Reptilia, Gekkonidae). Smithsonian Contributions to Zoology, no. 631. Washington, D.C.: Smithsonian Institution Scholarly Press, 2010.

External links

Geckos
Reptiles of China
Reptiles of India
Reptiles of Indonesia
Reptiles of Japan
Reptiles of Malaysia
Reptiles of Mauritius
Reptiles of Myanmar
Geckos of New Caledonia
Reptiles of Oceania
Reptiles of the Philippines
Vertebrates of Réunion
Reptiles of Sri Lanka
Reptiles of Taiwan
Reptiles of Thailand
Reptiles of Vietnam
Reptiles described in 1860
Taxa named by Pieter Bleeker
Reptiles of Fiji